Environmental governance (EG) consist of a system of laws, norms, rules, policies and practices that dictate how the board members of an environment related regulatory body should manage and oversee the affairs of any environment related regulatory body which is responsible for ensuring sustainability (sustainable development) and manage all human activities—political, social and economic. Environmental governance includes government, business and civil society, and emphasizes whole system management. To capture this diverse range of elements, environmental governance often employs alternative systems of governance, for example watershed-based management.

It views natural resources and the environment as global public goods, belonging to the category of goods that are not diminished when they are shared. This means that everyone benefits from, for example, a breathable atmosphere, stable climate and stable biodiversity.

Public goods are non-rivalrous—a natural resource enjoyed by one person can still be enjoyed by others—and non-excludable—it is impossible to prevent someone consuming the good (such as breathing). Public goods are recognized as beneficial and therefore have value. The notion of a global public good thus emerges, with a slight distinction: it covers necessities that must not be destroyed by one person or state.

The non-rivalrous character of such goods calls for a management approach that restricts public and private actors from damaging them. One approach is to attribute an economic value to the resource. Water is an example of this type of good.

Definitions

Environmental governance refers to the processes of decision-making involved in the control and management of the environment and natural resources. International Union for Conservation of Nature (IUCN), define environmental governance as the 'multi-level interactions (i.e., local, national, international/global) among, but not limited to, three main actors, i.e., state, market, and civil society, which interact with one another, whether in formal and informal ways; in formulating and implementing policies in response to environment-related demands and inputs from the society; bound by rules, procedures, processes, and widely accepted behavior; possessing characteristics of “good governance”; for the purpose of attaining environmentally-sustainable development' (IUCN 2014)

Key principles of environmental governance include:

 Embedding the environment in all levels of decision-making and action
 Conceptualizing cities and communities, economic and political life as a subset of the environment
 Emphasizing the connection of people to the ecosystems in which they live
 Promoting the transition from open-loop/cradle-to-grave systems (like garbage disposal with no recycling) to closed-loop/cradle-to-cradle systems (like permaculture and zero waste strategies).

Neoliberal environmental governance is an approach to the theory of environmental governance framed by a perspective on neoliberalism as an ideology, policy and practice in relation to the biophysical world. There are many definitions and applications of neoliberalism, e.g. in economic, international relations, etc. However, the traditional understanding of neoliberalism is often simplified to the notion of the primacy of market-led economics through the rolling back of the state, deregulation and privatisation. Neoliberalism has evolved particularly over the last 40 years with many scholars leaving their ideological footprint on the neoliberal map. Hayek and Friedman believed in the superiority of the free market over state intervention. As long as the market was allowed to act freely, the supply/demand law would ensure the ‘optimal’ price and reward. In Karl Polanyi’s opposing view this would also create a state of tension in which self-regulating free markets disrupt and alter social interactions and “displace other valued means of living and working”. However, in contrast to the notion of an unregulated market economy there has also been a “paradoxical increase in [state] intervention” in the choice of economic, legislative and social policy reforms, which are pursued by the state to preserve the neoliberal order. This contradictory process is described by Peck and Tickell as roll back/roll out neoliberalism in which on one hand the state willingly gives up the control over resources and responsibility for social provision while on the other, it engages in “purposeful construction and consolidation of neoliberalised state forms, modes of governance, and regulatory relations".

There has been a growing interest in the effects of neoliberalism on the politics of the non-human world of environmental governance. Neoliberalism is seen to be more than a homogenous and monolithic ‘thing’ with a clear end point. It is a series of path-dependent, spatially and temporally “connected neoliberalisation” processes which affect and are affected by nature and environment that “cover a remarkable array of places, regions and countries”.  Co-opting neoliberal ideas of the importance of private property and the protection of individual (investor) rights, into environmental governance can be seen in the example of recent multilateral trade agreements (see in particular the North American Free Trade Agreement). Such neoliberal structures further reinforce a process of nature enclosure and primitive accumulation or “accumulation by dispossession” that serves to privatise increasing areas of nature. The ownership-transfer of resources traditionally not privately owned to free market mechanisms is believed to deliver greater efficiency and optimal return on investment. Other similar examples of neo-liberal inspired projects include the enclosure of minerals, the fisheries quota system in the North Pacific and the privatisation of water supply and sewage treatment in England and Wales. All three examples share neoliberal characteristics to “deploy markets as the solution to environmental problems” in which scarce natural resources are commercialized and turned into commodities. The approach to frame the ecosystem in the context of a price-able commodity is also present in the work of neoliberal geographers who subject nature to price and supply/demand mechanisms where the earth is considered to be a quantifiable resource (Costanza, for example, estimates the earth ecosystem's service value to be between 16 and 54 trillion dollars per year).

Environmental issues

Main drivers of environmental degradation

Economic growth – The development-centric vision that prevails in most countries and international institutions advocates a headlong rush towards more economic growth. Environmental economists on the other hand, point to a close correlation between economic growth and environmental degradation, arguing for qualitative development as an alternative to growth. As a result, the past couple of decades has seen a big shift towards sustainable development as an alternative to neo-liberal economics. There are those, particularly within the alternative globalization movement, who maintain that it is feasible to change to a degrowth phase without losing social efficiency or lowering the quality of life.

Consumption – The growth of consumption and the cult of consumption, or consumerist ideology, is the major cause of economic growth. Overdevelopment, seen as the only alternative to poverty, has become an end in itself. The means for curbing this growth are not equal to the task, since the phenomenon is not confined to a growing middle class in developing countries, but also concerns the development of irresponsible lifestyles, particularly in northern countries, such as the increase in the size and number of homes and cars per person.

Destruction of biodiversity – The complexity of the planet's ecosystems means that the loss of any species has unexpected consequences. The stronger the impact on biodiversity, the stronger the likelihood of a chain reaction with unpredictable negative effects. Another important factor of environmental degradation that falls under this destruction of biodiversity, and must not be ignored is deforestation. Despite all the damage inflicted, a number of ecosystems have proved to be resilient. Environmentalists are endorsing a precautionary principle whereby all potentially damaging activities would have to be analyzed for their environmental impact.

Population growth – Forecasts predict 8.9 billion people on the planet in 2050. This is a subject which primarily affects developing countries, but also concerns northern countries; although their demographic growth is lower, the environmental impact per person is far higher in these countries. Demographic growth needs to be countered by developing education and family planning programs and generally improving women's status.

"Pollution" - Pollution caused by the use of fossil fuels is another driver of environmental destruction. The burning of carbon-based fossil fuels such as coal and oil, releases carbon dioxide into the atmosphere. One of the major impacts of this is the climate change that is currently taking place on the planet, where the earth's temperature is gradually rising. Given that fuels such as coal and oil are the most heavily used fuels, this a great concern to many environmentalists.

"Agricultural practices" - Destructive agricultural practices such as overuse of fertilizers and overgrazing lead to land degradation. The soil gets eroded, and leads to silting in rivers and reservoirs. Soil erosion is a continuous cycle and ultimately results in desertification of the land. Apart from land degradation, water pollution is also a possibility; chemicals used in farming can run-off into rivers and contaminate the water.

Challenges

Challenges facing environmental governance include:

 Inadequate continental and global agreements
 Unresolved tensions between maximum development, sustainable development and maximum protection, limiting funding, damaging links with the economy and limiting application of Multilateral Environment Agreements (MEAs).
 Environmental funding is not self-sustaining, diverting resources from problem-solving into funding battles.
 Lack of integration of sector policies
 Inadequate institutional capacities
 Ill-defined priorities
 Unclear objectives
 Lack of coordination within the UN, governments, the private sector and civil society
 Lack of shared vision
 Interdependencies among development/sustainable economic growth, trade, agriculture, health, peace and security.
 International imbalance between environmental governance and trade and finance programs, e.g., World Trade Organization (WTO).
 Limited credit for organizations running projects within the Global Environment Facility (GEF)
 Linking UNEP, United Nations Development Programme (UNDP) and the World Bank with MEAs
 Lack of government capacity to satisfy MEA obligations
 Absence of the gender perspective and equity in environmental governance
 Inability to influence public opinion
 Time lag between human action and environmental effect, sometimes as long as a generation
 Environmental problems being embedded in very complex systems, of which our understanding is still quite weak

All of these challenges have implications on governance, however international environmental governance is necessary. The IDDRI claims that rejection of multilateralism in the name of efficiency and protection of national interests conflicts with the promotion of international law and the concept of global public goods. Others cite the complex nature of environmental problems.

On the other hand, The Agenda 21 program has been implemented in over 7,000 communities. Environmental problems, including global-scale problems, may not always require global solutions. For example, marine pollution can be tackled regionally, and ecosystem deterioration can be addressed locally. Other global problems such as climate change benefit from local and regional action.

Bäckstrand and Saward wrote, “sustainability and environmental protection is an arena in which innovative experiments with new hybrid, plurilateral forms of governance, along with the incorporation of a transnational civil society spanning the public-private divide, are taking place.”

Local governance
A 1997 report observed a global consensus that sustainable development implementation should be based on local level solutions and initiatives designed with and by the local communities. Community participation and partnership along with the decentralisation of government power to local communities are important aspects of environmental governance at the local level. Initiatives such as these are integral divergence from earlier environmental governance approaches which was “driven by state agendas and resource control” and followed a top-down or trickle down approach rather than the bottom up approach that local level governance encompasses. The adoption of practices or interventions at a local scale can, in part, be explained by diffusion of innovation theory. In Tanzania and in the Pacific, researchers have illustrated that aspects of the intervention, of the adopter, and of the social-ecological context all shape why community-centered conservation interventions spread through space and time. Local level governance shifts decision-making power away from the state and/or governments to the grassroots. Local level governance is extremely important even on a global scale. Environmental governance at the global level is defined as international and as such has resulted in the marginalisation of local voices. Local level governance is important to bring back power to local communities in the global fight against environmental degridation.  Pulgar Vidal observed a “new institutional framework, [wherein] decision-making regarding access to and use of natural resources has become increasingly decentralized.” He noted four techniques that can be used to develop these processes:

 formal and informal regulations, procedures and processes, such as consultations and participative democracy;
 social interaction that can arise from participation in development programs or from the reaction to perceived injustice;
 regulating social behaviours to reclassify an individual question as a public matter;
 within-group participation in decision-making and relations with external actors.

He found that the key conditions for developing decentralized environmental governance are:

 access to social capital, including local knowledge, leaders and local shared vision;
 democratic access to information and decision-making;
 local government activity in environmental governance: as facilitator of access to natural resources, or as policy maker;
 an institutional framework that favours decentralized environmental governance and creates forums for social interaction and making widely accepted agreements acceptable.

The legitimacy of decisions depends on the local population's participation rate and on how well participants represent that population.
With regard to public authorities, questions linked to biodiversity can be faced by adopting appropriate policies and strategies, through exchange of knowledge and experience, the forming of partnerships, correct management of land use, monitoring of biodiversity and optimal use of resources, or reducing consumption, and promoting environmental certifications, such as EMAS and/or ISO 14001. Local authorities undoubtedly have a central role to play in the protection of biodiversity and this strategy is successful above all when the authorities show strength by involving stakeholders in a credible environmental improvement project and activating a transparent and effective communication policy (Ioppolo et al., 2013).

State governance
States play a crucial role in environmental governance, because "however far and fast international economic integration proceeds, political authority remains vested in national governments". It is for this reason that governments should respect and support the commitment to implementation of international agreements.

At the state level, environmental management has been found to be conducive to the creation of roundtables and committees. In France, the Grenelle de l’environnement process:

 included a variety of actors (e.g. the state, political leaders, unions, businesses, not-for-profit organizations and environmental protection foundations);
 allowed stakeholders to interact with the legislative and executive powers in office as indispensable advisors;
 worked to integrate other institutions, particularly the Economic and Social Council, to form a pressure group that participated in the process for creating an environmental governance model;
 attempted to link with environmental management at regional and local levels.

If environmental issues are excluded from e.g., the economic agenda, this may delegitimize those institutions.

“In southern countries, the main obstacle to the integration of intermediate levels in the process of territorial environmental governance development is often the dominance of developmentalist inertia in states’ political mindset. The question of the environment has not been effectively integrated in national development planning and programs. Instead, the most common idea is that environmental protection curbs economic and social development, an idea encouraged by the frenzy for exporting raw materials extracted using destructive methods that consume resources and fail to generate any added value.” Of course they are justified in this thinking, as their main concerns are social injustices such as poverty alleviation. Citizens in some of these states have responded by developing empowerment strategies to ease poverty through sustainable development. In addition to this, policymakers must be more aware of these concerns of the global south, and must make sure to integrate a strong focus on social justice in their policies.

Global governance 
According to the International Institute for Sustainable Development, global environmental governance is "the sum of organizations, policy instruments, financing mechanisms, rules, procedures and norms that regulate the processes of global environmental protection." At the global level there are numerous important actors involved in environmental governance and "a range of institutions contribute to and help define the practice of global environmental governance. The idea of global environmental governance is to govern the environment at a global level through a range of nation states and non state actors such as national governments, NGOs and other international organisations such as UNEP (United Nations Environment Programme). The global environmental movement can be traced back to the 19th century; academics acknowledge the role of the United Nations for providing a platform for international conversations regarding the environment. Supporters of global environmental governance emphasize the importance of international cooperation on environmental issues such as climate change. Some opponents argue that more aggressive regional environmental governance has a stronger impact compared to global environmental governance.

Global environmental governance is the answer to calls for new forms of governance because of the increasing complexity of the international agenda. It is perceived to be an effective form of multilateral management and essential to the international community in meeting goals of mitigation and the possible reversal of the impacts on the global environment. However, a precise definition of global environmental governance is still vague and there are many issues surrounding global governance.
Elliot argues that “the congested institutional terrain still provides more of an appearance than a reality of comprehensive global governance.” It is a political practice which simultaneously reflects, constitutes and masks global relations of power and powerlessness.” State agendas exploit the use of global environmental governance to enhance their oven agendas or wishes even if this is at the detriment of the vital element behind global environmental governance which is the environment. Elliot states that global environmental governance “is neither normatively neutral nor materially benign.”
As explored by Newell, report notes by The Global Environmental Outlook noted that the systems of global environmental governance are becoming increasingly irrelevant or impotent due to patterns of globalisation such as; imbalances in productivity and the distribution of goods and services, unsustainable progression of extremes of wealth and poverty and population and economic growth overtaking environmental gains. Newell states that, despite such acknowledgements, the “managing of global environmental change within International Relations continues to look to international regimes for the answers.”

Environmental Governance in the Global North and Global South 
Relations between the Global North and Global South have been impacted by a history of colonialism, during which Northern colonial powers contributed to environmental degradation of natural resources in the South. This dynamic continues to influence international relations and is the basis for what some historians recognize as the "North-South divide." Scholars argue that this divide has created hurdles in the international lawmaking process regarding the environment. Scholars have noted that unindustrialized countries in the Global South sometimes are disconnected from environmentalism and perceive environmental governance to be a "luxury" priority for the Global North. In recent years, sustainable development has made its way to the forefront of international discourse and urges the North and South to cooperate.  Academics recognized that environmental governance priorities in the Global North have been at odds with the desire to focus on economic development in the Global South.

Some analysts propose a shift towards "non-state" actors for the development of environmental governance. Environmental politics researcher Karin Bäckstrand claims this will increase transparency, accountability, and legitimacy. In some cases, scholars have noted that environmental governance in the Global North has had adverse consequences on the environment in the Global South. Environmental and economic priorities in the Global North do not always align with those in the Global South. Producers in the Global North developed voluntary sustainability standards (VSS) to address environmental concerns in the North, but these standards also end up impacting economic activity in the Global South. Jeffrey J. Minneti from the William & Mary Law School has argued that the Global South needs to "manage its own ecological footprint" by creating VSS independent from the Global North. Tension between countries in the Global North and Global South has caused some academics to criticize global environmental governance for being too slow of a process to enact policy change.

Outer Space Environmental Governance 
Since space travel and activities began in the 1950s, more nations have engaged in the race to use space more rigorously. More specifically, USA and Russia launched the world's first artificial satellite. The other new nations entering the space race lack the comprehensive space abilities similar to the US and Russia. The need and desire to expand into space creates numerous problems, none more prominent than the concern of space wreckages. Various organizations, including the Committee of Space Research, continue to implement ways to successfully and effectively govern the global sphere. Laws like the Planetary Protection Policy are meant to regulate the use of space, specifically, the issue of space debris. As each launch becomes more and more dangerous, the policy development of various countries is unbalanced, and there is a lack of unified international standards and norms. Space is at risk of permanent damage or "Kessler syndrome" (an on-orbit collision chain reaction caused by major debris events). It increases the risk of paralyzed global space services, including GPS, the global financial system, and daily weather forecasts. Although the Planetary Protection Policy law is not enforceable, it helps protect against the Moon's contamination and other celestial bodies. The space governing organizations implement laws that help regulate space use, thus, lessening space contamination. For instance, the 65% post-mission-disposal still falls well short of the 90% target, which China looks to increase to 95%. However, more countries are implementing additional measures to increase that number. Space Situational Awareness (SSA) is important because it monitors the conditions in space and helps improve Safety-of-Flight (SoF), increasing its comprehensiveness, timeliness, accuracy, and transparency.

Outer space is part of the environment because it is linked to the Earth's environment in numerous modest ways. For instance, the day-to-day changes in the weather system are closely related to outer space conditions. The solar wind repeatedly hits Earth's magnetic field, including its upper atmosphere, resulting in Earth's electrical properties. Furthermore, Earth sits at the center of the 'gale' of particles that emanate from the outer parts of the Sun's atmosphere. Like the solar wind but of much deeper space origin, cosmic rays also strike the Earth penetrating its lower atmosphere, where it is believed to help form low-level clouds. Lastly, outer space is part of the environment because its conditions affect the operations of spaceships, the health of astronauts, and the state and functioning of any other objects and satellites circumnavigating Earth. The international space order is amid an upheaval, adjustment, and reconstruction period. The global space economy will be worth $360 billion by 2018. However, as costs decline, it is expected that the entry barrier to space will continue to decrease. Countries are increasingly focusing their attention on space not only for national security but also for commercial opportunities. As a result, outer space environmental governance is being introduced gradually.

The space governance methods incorporate the issues provided in the Montreal Declaration, which requires the following elements. The inspection of the shifting international fiscal, social, and political environments and space infrastructure dependence; the identification and valuation of all known space threats and dangers; the inspection of all space prospects and the need for maintainable and diplomatic use of outer space, including the study and manipulation of space for the advantage of man; the recognition of safety, technical, and operative alterations requiring resolutions; and the endorsement of relevant space governance treaties, arrangements, guidelines, ethics, and apposite established mechanisms, inventions and procedures pertinent to existing and developing space events. Many countries aspire to be leaders and responsible actors in space and therefore support the international community's ongoing efforts to develop responsible behavior and norms for space operators. Countries such as Brazil, China, France, Japan, and South Africa are all working to establish standards of behavior in space, hoping to protect space assets through better space situational awareness and space traffic management.

Below are examples of policies from three different countries.

 Australia does not have a national space policy but emphasizes COPUOS standards for space debris mitigation while creating official guidelines for international launches. Australia has activated a C-band space surveillance radar system for the purpose of tracking space debris. These data from the southern hemisphere will help increase worldwide awareness of the state of the world's space and sustainable practices.
 France's outer space environmental governance policy is mostly seen in the 2011 Technical Regulations Decree, which focuses on launch and orbital licensing. The Technical Regulations Decree requires that rail systems be designed, manufactured, and implemented in such a way that debris is avoided during regular operation. At launch, the likelihood of disintegration in orbit must be less than one in 1,000. Additionally, it must be capable of safely deorbiting and re-entering the atmosphere once the mission is accomplished. If it cannot deorbit, it must adhere to the ITU's standards for geosynchronous orbits.
 Canada's government has established a regulatory framework aimed at reducing the formation of space debris. Operators must give an evaluation and plan for disposing of projected orbital debris. The Canadian Space Agency (CSA) has adopted the IADC principles for space debris mitigation and aims to implement them across all CSA activities. Additionally, the Canadian government requires licensees of spacecraft that operate in the radio frequency to submit a space debris mitigation strategy as part of the licensing process. Simultaneously, if the satellite is in a geosynchronous orbit, it must adhere to ITU standards.

Issues of scale

Multi-tier governance 

The literature on governance scale shows how changes in the understanding of environmental issues have led to the movement from a local view to recognising their larger and more complicated scale. This move brought an increase in the diversity, specificity and complexity of initiatives. Meadowcroft pointed out innovations that were layered on top of existing structures and processes, instead of replacing them.

Lafferty and Meadowcroft give three examples of multi-tiered governance: internationalisation, increasingly comprehensive approaches, and involvement of multiple governmental entities.  Lafferty and Meadowcroft described the resulting multi-tiered system as addressing issues on both smaller and wider scales.

Institutional fit 

Hans Bruyninckx claimed that a mismatch between the scale of the environmental problem and the level of the policy intervention was problematic.  Young claimed that such mismatches reduced the effectiveness of interventions.  Most of the literature addresses the level of governance rather than ecological scale.

Elinor Ostrom, amongst others, claimed that the mismatch is often the cause of unsustainable management practices and that simple solutions to the mismatch have not been identified.

Considerable debate has addressed the question of which level(s) should take responsibility for fresh water management. Development workers tend to address the problem at the local level. National governments focus on policy issues. This can create conflicts among states because rivers cross borders, leading to efforts to evolve governance of  river basins.

Environmental governance issues

Soil deterioration

Soil and land deterioration reduces its capacity for capturing, storing and recycling water, energy and food. Alliance 21 proposed solutions in the following domains:

 include soil rehabilitation as part of conventional and popular education
 involve all stakeholders, including policymakers and authorities, producers and land users, the scientific community and civil society to manage incentives and enforce regulations and laws
 establish a set of binding rules, such as an international convention
 set up mechanisms and incentives to facilitate transformations
 gather and share knowledge;
 mobilize funds nationally and internationally

Climate change
The scientific consensus on climate change is expressed in the reports of Intergovernmental Panel on Climate Change (IPCC) and also in the statements by all major scientific bodies in the United States such as National Academy of Sciences.

The drivers of climate change can include
- Changes in solar irradiance
- Changes in atmospheric trace gas and aerosol concentrations
Evidence of climate change can be identified by examining
- Atmospheric concentrations of Green House Gases (GHGs) such as carbon dioxide
- Land and sea surface temperatures
- Atmospheric water vapor
- Precipitation
- The occurrence or strength of extreme weather and climate events
- Glaciers
- Rapid sea ice loss
- Sea level

It is suggested by climate models that the changes in temperature and sea level can be the causal effects of human activities such as consumption of fossil fuels, deforestation, increased agricultural production and production of xenobiotic gases.

There has been increasing actions in order to mitigate climate change and reduce its impact at national, regional and international levels. Kyoto protocol and United Nations Framework Convention on Climate Change (UNFCCC) plays the most important role in addressing climate change at an international level.

The goal of combating climate change led to the adoption of the Kyoto Protocol by 191 states, an agreement encouraging the reduction of greenhouse gases, mainly . Since developed economies produce more emissions per capita, limiting emissions in all countries inhibits opportunities for emerging economies, the only major success in efforts to produce a global response to the phenomenon.

Two decades following the Brundtland Report, however, there has been no improvement in the key indicators highlighted.

Biodiversity

Environmental governance for protecting the biodiversity has to act in many levels. Biodiversity is fragile because it is threatened by almost all human actions. To promote conservation of biodiversity, agreements and laws have to be created to regulate agricultural activities, urban growth, industrialization of countries, use of natural resources, control of invasive species,  the correct use of water and protection of air quality. Before making any decision for a region or country decision makers, politicians and community have to take into account what are the potential impacts for biodiversity, that any project can have.

Population growth and urbanization have been a great contributor for deforestation. Also, population growth requires more intense agricultural areas use, which also results in necessity of new areas to be deforested. This causes habitat loss, which is one of the major threats for biodiversity. Habitat loss and  habitat fragmentation affects all species, because they all rely on limited resources, to feed on and to breed.

‘Species are genetically unique and irreplaceable their loss is irreversible. Ecosystems vary across a vast range of parameters, and similar ecosystems (whether wetlands, forests, coastal reserves etc) cannot be presumed to be interchangeable, such that the loss of one can be compensated by protection or restoration of another’.

To avoid habitat loss, and consequently biodiversity loss, politicians and lawmakers should be aware of the precautionary principle, which means that before approving a project or law all the pros and cons should be carefully analysed. Sometimes the impacts are not explicit, or not even proved to exist. However, if there is any chance of an irreversible impact happen, it should be taken into consideration.

To promote environmental governance for biodiversity protection there has to be a clear articulation between values and interests while negotiating environmental management plans. International agreements are good way to have it done right.

The Convention on Biological Diversity (CBD) was signed in Rio de Janeiro in 1992 human activities. The CBD's objectives are: “to conserve biological diversity, to use biological diversity in a sustainable fashion, to share the benefits of biological diversity fairly and equitably.” The convention is the first global agreement to address all aspects of biodiversity: genetic resources, species and ecosystems. It recognizes, for the first time, that the conservation of biological diversity is “a common concern for all humanity”. The       Convention encourages joint efforts on measures for scientific and technological cooperation, access to genetic resources and the transfer of clean environmental technologies.

The Convention on Biological Diversity most important edition happened in 2010 when the Strategic Plan for Biodiversity 2011-2020 and the Aichi Targets, were launched. These two projects together make the United Nations decade on Biodiversity. It was held in Japan and has the targets of ‘halting and eventually reversing the loss of biodiversity of the planet’.  The Strategic Plan for Biodiversity has the goal to ‘promote its overall vision of living in harmony with nature’ As result (...) ‘mainstream biodiversity at different levels. Throughout the United Nations Decade on Biodiversity, governments are encouraged to develop, implement and communicate the results of national strategies for implementation of the Strategic Plan for Biodiversity’. According to the CBD  the five Aichi targets are:
‘Address the underlying causes of biodiversity loss by mainstreaming biodiversity across government and society;
Reduce the direct pressures on biodiversity and promote sustainable use;
Improve the status of biodiversity by safeguarding ecosystems, species and genetic diversity;
Enhance the benefits to all from biodiversity and ecosystem services;
Enhance implementation through participatory planning, knowledge management and capacity building.’

Water 

The 2003 UN World Water Development Report claimed that the amount of water available over the next twenty years would drop by 30%.
In the same report, it is indicated that in 1998, 2.2 million people died from diarrhoeal diseases. In 2004, the UK's WaterAid charity reported that one child died every 15 seconds from water-linked diseases.

According to Alliance 21 “All levels of water supply management are necessary and independent. The integrated approach to the catchment areas must take into account the needs of irrigation and those of towns, jointly and not separately as is often seen to be the case....The governance of a water supply must be guided by the principles of sustainable development.”

Australian water resources have always been variable but they are becoming increasingly so with changing climate conditions. Because of how limited water resources are in Australia, there needs to be an effective implementation of environmental governance conducted within the country. Water restrictions are an important policy device used in Australian environmental governance to limit the amount of water used in urban and agricultural environments (Beeton et al. 2006). There is increased pressure on surface water resources in Australia because of the uncontrolled growth in groundwater use and the constant threat of drought. These increased pressures not only affect the quantity and quality of the waterways but they also negatively affect biodiversity. The government needs to create policies that preserve, protect and monitor Australia's inland water. The most significant environmental governance policy imposed by the Australian government is environmental flow allocations that allocate water to the natural environment. The proper implementation of water trading systems could help to conserve water resources in Australia. Over the years there has been an increase in demand for water, making Australia the third largest per capita user of water in the world (Beeton et al. 2006). If this trend continues, the gap between supply and demand will need to be addressed. The government needs to implement more efficient water allocations and raise water rates (UNEP, 2014). By changing public perception to promote the action of reusing and recycling water some of the stress of water shortages can be alleviated.  More extensive solutions like desalination plants, building more dams and using aquifer storage are all options that could be taken to conserve water levels but all these methods are controversial. With caps on surface water use, both urban and rural consumers are turning to groundwater use; this has caused groundwater levels to decline significantly. Groundwater use is very hard to monitor and regulate. There is not enough research currently being conducted to accurately determine sustainable yields. Some regions are seeing improvement in groundwater levels by applying caps on bores and the amount of water that consumers are allowed to extract. There have been projects in environmental governance aimed at restoring vegetation in the riparian zone. Restoring riparian vegetation helps increase biodiversity, reduce salinity, prevent soil erosion and prevent riverbank collapse. Many rivers and waterways are controlled by weirs and locks that control the flow of rivers and also prevent the movement of fish. The government has funded fish-ways on some weirs and locks to allow for native fish to move upstream. Wetlands have significantly suffered under restricted water resources with water bird numbers dropping and a decrease in species diversity. The allocation of water for bird breeding through environmental flows in Macquarie Marshes has led to an increase in breeding (Beeton et al. 2006). Because of dry land salinity throughout Australia there has been an increase in the levels of salt in Australian waterways. There has been funding in salt interception schemes which help to improve in-stream salinity levels but whether river salinity has improved or not is still unclear because there is not enough data available yet. High salinity levels are dangerous because they can negatively affect larval and juvenile stages of certain fish. The introduction of invasive species into waterways has negatively affected native aquatic species because invasive species compete with native species and alter natural habitats. There has been research in producing daughterless carp to help eradicate carp. Government funding has also gone into building in-stream barriers that trap the carp and prevent them from moving into floodplains and wetlands.  Investment in national and regional programmes like the Living Murray (MDBC), Healthy Waterways Partnership and the Clean Up the Swan Programme are leading to important environmental governance. The Healthy Rivers programme promotes restoration and recovery of environmental flows, riparian re-vegetation and aquatic pest control.  The Living Murray programme has been crucial for the allocation of water to the environment by creating an agreement to recover 500 billion litres of water to the Murray River environment. Environmental governance and water resource management in Australia must be constantly monitored and adapted to suit the changing environmental conditions within the country (Beeton et al. 2006). If environmental programmes are governed with transparency there can be a reduction in policy fragmentation and an increase in policy efficiency (Mclntyre, 2010). In Arab countries, the extensive use of water for agriculture also needs critical attention since agriculture in this region has less contribution for its national income.

Ozone layer

On 16 September 1987 the United Nations General Assembly signed the Montreal Protocol to address the declining ozone layer. Since that time, the use of chlorofluorocarbons (industrial refrigerants and aerosols) and farming fungicides such as methyl bromide has mostly been eliminated, although other damaging gases are still in use.

Nuclear risk

The Nuclear non-proliferation treaty is the primary multilateral agreement governing nuclear activity.

Transgenic organisms
Genetically modified organisms are not the subject of any major multilateral agreements. They are the subject of various restrictions at other levels of governance. GMOs are in widespread use in the US, but are heavily restricted in many other jurisdictions.

Controversies have ensued over golden rice, genetically modified salmon, genetically modified seeds, disclosure and other topics.

Precautionary principle 

The precautionary principle or precautionary approach states that if an action or policy has a suspected risk of causing harm to the public or to the environment, in the absence of scientific consensus that the action or policy is harmful, the burden of proof that it is not harmful falls on those taking an action. As of 2013 it was not the basis of major multilateral agreements.
The Precautionary Principle is put into effect if there is a chance that proposed action may cause harm to the society or the environment. Therefore, those involved in the proposed action must provide evidence that it will not be harmful, even if scientists do not believe that it will cause harm. It falls upon the policymakers to make the optimal decision, if there is any risk, even without any credible scientific evidence. However, taking precautionary action also means that there is an element of cost involved, either social or economic. So if the cost was seen as insignificant the action would be taken without the implementation of the precautionary principle. But often the cost is ignored, which can lead to harmful repercussions. This is often the case with industry and scientists who are primarily concerned with protecting their own interests.

Socio-environmental conflicts 
Environmental issues such as natural resource management and climate change have security and social considerations. Drinking water scarcity and climate change can cause mass migrations of climate refugees, for example.

Social network analysis has been applied to understand how different actors cooperate and conflict in environmental governance. Existing relationships can influence how stakeholders collaborate during times of conflict: a study of transportation planning and land use in California found that stakeholders choose their collaborative partners by avoiding those with the most dissimilar beliefs, rather than by selecting for those with shared views. The result is known as homophily—actors with similar views are more likely to end up collaborating than those with opposing views.

Orbital debris 
Since the beginning of space exploration and operations in the 1950s, additional countries have joined the race to utilize space more intensively. The United States and Russia launched the first artificial satellite. Human space operations have resulted in a large amount of trash in the sky. Among these is the last stage of a rocket, functioning pieces of starting explosive devices, disintegration fragments created by the mutual impact of space vehicles or arrows (projectiles) as a result of their explosion. In the vicinity of the Earth, there are already more than 50,000 abandoned spacecraft and space junk as each launch gets hazardous. A "Kessler syndrome" or "permanent harm" might occur, which means one fragment breaks up and collides with another fragment, causing a series of collisions, which eventually pollutes the whole orbit of the satellite. Space has become a part of daily human life, from telecommunications to disaster monitoring. The loss of any satellite is a serious problem, such as GPS, the global financial system, and daily weather forecasts.

Agreements

Conventions

The main multilateral conventions, also known as Rio Conventions, are as follows:

Convention on Biological Diversity (CBD) (1992–1993): aims to conserve biodiversity. Related agreements include the Cartagena Protocol on biosafety.

United Nations Framework Convention on Climate Change (UNFCC) (1992–1994): aims to stabilize concentrations of greenhouse gases at a level that would stabilize the climate system without threatening food production, and enabling the pursuit of sustainable economic development; it incorporates the Kyoto Protocol.

United Nations Convention to Combat Desertification (UNCCD) (1994–1996): aims to combat desertification and mitigate the effects of drought and desertification, in developing countries (Though initially the convention was primarily meant for Africa).

Further conventions:
 Ramsar Convention on Wetlands of International Importance (1971–1975)
 UNESCO World Heritage Convention  (1972–1975)
 Convention on International Trade in Endangered Species of Wild Flora and Fauna (CITES) (1973–1975)
 Bonn Convention on the Conservation of Migratory Species (1979–1983)
 Convention on the Protection and Use of Transboundary Watercourses and International Lakes (Water Convention) (1992–1996)
 Basel Convention on the Control of Transboundary Movements of Hazardous Wastes and their Disposal (1989–1992)
 Rotterdam Convention on the Prior Informed Consent Procedures for Certain Hazardous Chemicals and Pesticides in International Trade
 Stockholm Convention on Persistent Organic Pollutants (COP) (2001–2004)

The Rio Conventions are characterized by:

 obligatory execution by signatory states
 involvement in a sector of global environmental governance
 focus on the fighting poverty and the development of sustainable living conditions;
 funding from the Global Environment Facility (GEF) for countries with few financial resources;
 inclusion of a for assessing ecosystem status

Environmental conventions are regularly criticized for their:

 rigidity and verticality: they are too descriptive, homogenous and top down, not reflecting the diversity and complexity of environmental issues. Signatory countries struggle to translate objectives into concrete form and incorporate them consistently;
 duplicate structures and aid: the sector-specific format of the conventions produced duplicate structures and procedures. Inadequate cooperation between government ministries;
 contradictions and incompatibility: e.g., “if reforestation projects to reduce  give preference to monocultures of exotic species, this can have a negative impact on biodiversity (whereas natural regeneration can strengthen both biodiversity and the conditions needed for life).”

Until now, the formulation of environmental policies at the international level has been divided by theme, sector or territory, resulting in treaties that overlap or clash. International attempts to coordinate environment institutions, include the Inter-Agency Coordination Committee and the Commission for Sustainable Development, but these institutions are not powerful enough to effectively incorporate the three aspects of sustainable development.

Multilateral Environmental Agreements (MEAs)

MEAs are agreements between several countries that apply internationally or regionally and concern a variety of environmental questions. As of 2013 over 500 Multilateral Environmental Agreements (MEAs), including 45 of global scope involve at least 72 signatory countries. Further agreements cover regional environmental problems, such as deforestation in Borneo or pollution in the Mediterranean. Each agreement has a specific mission and objectives ratified by multiple states.

Many Multilateral Environmental Agreements have been negotiated with the support from the United Nations Environmental Programme and work towards the achievement of the United Nations Millennium Development Goals as a means to instil sustainable practices for the environment and its people. Multilateral Environmental Agreements are considered to present enormous opportunities for greener societies and economies which can deliver numerous benefits in addressing food, energy and water security and in achieving sustainable development. These agreements can be implemented on a global or regional scale, for example the issues surrounding the disposal of hazardous waste can be implemented on a regional level as per the Bamako Convention on the Ban of the Import into Africa and the Control of Transboundary Movement and Management of Hazardous Waste within Africa which applies specifically to Africa, or the global approach to hazardous waste such as the Basel Convention on the Control of Transboundary Movements of Hazardous Wastes and their Disposal which is monitored throughout the world.

“The environmental governance structure defined by the Rio and Johannesburg Summits is sustained by UNEP, MEAs and developmental organizations and consists of assessment and policy development, as well as project implementation at the country level.

"The governance structure consists of a chain of phases:

 a) assessment of environment status;
 b) international policy development;
 c) formulation of MEAs;
 d) policy implementation;
 e) policy assessment;
 f) enforcement;
 g) sustainable development.

"Traditionally, UNEP has focused on the normative role of engagement in the first three
phases. Phases (d) to (f) are covered by MEAs and the sustainable development phase involves developmental organizations such as UNDP and the World Bank.”

Lack of coordination affects the development of coherent governance. The report shows that donor states support development organizations, according to their individual interests. They do not follow a joint plan, resulting in overlaps and duplication. MEAs tend not to become a joint frame of reference and therefore receive little financial support. States and organizations emphasize existing regulations rather than improving and adapting them.

Background

The risks associated with nuclear fission raised global awareness of environmental threats. The 1963 Partial Nuclear Test Ban Treaty prohibiting atmospheric nuclear testing was the beginning of the globalization of environmental issues. Environmental law began to be modernized and coordinated with the Stockholm Conference (1972), backed up in 1980 by the Vienna Convention on the Law of Treaties. The Vienna Convention for the Protection of the Ozone Layer was signed and ratified in 1985. In 1987, 24 countries signed the Montreal Protocol which imposed the gradual withdrawal of CFCs.

The Brundtland Report, published in 1987 by the UN Commission on Environment and Development, stipulated the need for economic development that “meets the needs of the present without compromising the capacity of future generations to meet their needs.

Rio Conference (1992) and reactions

The United Nations Conference on Environment and Development (UNCED), better known as the 1992 Earth Summit, was the first major international meeting since the end of the Cold War and was attended by delegations from 175 countries. Since then the biggest international conferences that take place every 10 years guided the global governance process with a series of MEAs. Environmental treaties are applied with the help of secretariats.

Governments created international treaties in the 1990s to check global threats to the environment. These treaties are far more restrictive than global protocols and set out to change non-sustainable production and consumption models.

Agenda 21

Agenda 21 is a detailed plan of actions to be implemented at the global, national and local levels by UN organizations, member states and key individual groups in all regions. Agenda 21 advocates making sustainable development a legal principle law. At the local level, local Agenda 21 advocates an inclusive, territory-based strategic plan, incorporating sustainable environmental and social policies.

The Agenda has been accused of using neoliberal principles, including free trade to achieve environmental goals. For example, chapter two, entitled “International Cooperation to Accelerate Sustainable Development in Developing Countries and Related Domestic Policies” states, “The international economy should provide a supportive international climate for achieving environment and development goals by: promoting sustainable development through trade liberalization.”

Actors

International institutions

United Nations Environment Program

The UNEP has had its biggest impact as a monitoring and advisory body, and in developing environmental agreements. It has also contributed to strengthening the institutional capacity of environment ministries.

In 2002 UNEP held a conference to focus on product lifecycle impacts, emphasizing the fashion, advertising, financial and retail industries, seen as key agents in promoting sustainable consumption.

According to Ivanova, UNEP adds value in environmental monitoring, scientific assessment and information sharing, but cannot lead all environmental management processes. She proposed the following tasks for UNEP:

 initiate a strategic independent overhaul of its mission;
 consolidate the financial information and transparency process;
 restructure organizing governance by creating an operative executive council that balances the omnipresence of the overly imposing and fairly ineffectual Governing Council/Global Ministerial Environment Forum (GMEF).

Other proposals offer a new mandate to “produce greater unity amongst social and environmental agencies, so that the concept of ‘environment for development’ becomes a reality. It needs to act as a platform for establishing standards and for other types of interaction with national and international organizations and the United Nations. The principles of cooperation and common but differentiated responsibilities should be reflected in the application of this revised mandate.”

Sherman proposed principles to strengthen UNEP:

 obtain a social consensus on a long-term vision;
 analyze the current situation and future scenarios;
 produce a comprehensive plan covering all aspects of sustainable development;
 build on existing strategies and processes;
 multiply links between national and local strategies;
 include all these points in the financial and budget plan;
 adopt fast controls to improve process piloting and identification of progress made;
 implement effective participation mechanisms.

Another group stated, “Consider the specific needs of developing countries and respect of the fundamental principle of 'common but differentiated responsibilities'. Developed countries should promote technology transfer, new and additional financial resources, and capacity building for meaningful participation of developing countries in international environmental governance. Strengthening of international environmental governance should occur in the context of sustainable development and should involve civil society as an important stakeholder and agent of transformation.”

Global Environment Facility (GEF)

Created in 1991, the Global Environment Facility is an independent financial organization initiated by donor governments including Germany and France. It was the first financial organization dedicated to the environment at the global level. As of 2013 it had 179 members. Donations are used for projects covering biodiversity, climate change, international waters, destruction of the ozone layer, soil degradation and persistent organic pollutants.

GEF's institutional structure includes UNEP, UNDP and the World Bank. It is the funding mechanism for the four environmental conventions: climate change, biodiversity, persistent organic pollutants and desertification. GEF transfers resources from developed countries to developing countries to fund UNDP, UNEP and World Bank projects. The World Bank manages the annual budget of US$561.10 million.

The GEF has been criticized for its historic links with the World Bank, at least during its first phase during the 1990s, and for having favoured certain regions to the detriment of others. Another view sees it as contributing to the emergence of a global "green market". It represents “an adaptation (of the World Bank) to this emerging world order, as a response to the emergence of environmental movements that are becoming a geopolitical force.”  Developing countries demanded financial transfers to help them protect their environment.

GEF is subject to economic profitability criteria, as is the case for all the conventions. It received more funds in its first three years than the UNEP has since its creation in 1972. GEF funding represents less than 1% of development aid between 1992 and 2002.

United Nations Commission on Sustainable Development (CSD)

This intergovernmental institution meets twice a year to assess follow-up on Rio Summit goals. The CSD is made up of 53 member states, elected every three years and was reformed in 2004 to help improve implementation of Agenda 21. It meets twice a year, focusing on a specific theme during each two-year period: 2004-2005 was dedicated to water and 2006–2007 to climate change. The CSD has been criticized for its low impact, general lack of presence and the absence of Agenda 21 at the state level specifically, according to a report by the World Resources Institute. Its mission focuses on sequencing actions and establishing agreements puts it in conflict with institutions such as UNEP and OECD.

World Environment Organization (WEO)

A proposed World Environment Organization, analogous to the World Health Organization could be capable of adapting treaties and enforcing international standards.

The European Union, particularly France and Germany, and a number of NGOs favour creating a WEO. The United Kingdom, the US and most developing countries prefer to focus on voluntary initiatives. WEO partisans maintain that it could offer better political leadership, improved legitimacy and more efficient coordination. Its detractors argue that existing institutions and missions already provide appropriate environmental governance; however the lack of coherence and coordination between them and the absence of clear division of responsibilities prevents them from greater effectiveness.

World Bank

The World Bank influences environmental governance through other actors, particularly the GEF. The World Bank's mandate is not sufficiently defined in terms of environmental governance despite the fact that it is included in its mission. However, it allocates 5 to 10% of its annual funds to environmental projects. The institution's capitalist vocation means that its investment is concentrated solely in areas which are profitable in terms of cost benefits, such as climate change action and ozone layer protection, whilst neglecting other such as adapting to climate change and desertification. Its financial autonomy means that it can make its influence felt indirectly on the creation of standards, and on international and regional negotiations.

Following intense criticism in the 1980s for its support for destructive projects which, amongst other consequences, caused deforestation of tropical forests, the World Bank drew up its own environment-related standards in the 1990s so it could correct its actions. These standards differ from UNEP's standards, meant to be the benchmark, thus discrediting the institution and sowing disorder and conflict in the world of environmental governance. Other financial institutions, regional development banks and the private sector also drew up their own standards. Criticism is not directed at the World Bank's standards in themselves, which Najam considered as “robust”, but at their legitimacy and efficacy.

GEF 

The GEF's account of itself as of 2012  is as "the largest public funder of projects to improve the global environment", period, which "provides grants for projects related to biodiversity, climate change, international waters, land degradation, the ozone layer, and persistent organic pollutants."  It claims to have provided "$10.5 billion in grants and leveraging $51 billion in co-financing for over 2,700 projects in over 165 countries [and] made more than 14,000 small grants directly to civil society and community-based organizations, totaling $634 million."  It serves as mechanism for the:
Convention on Biological Diversity (CBD)
United Nations Framework Convention on Climate Change (UNFCCC)
Stockholm Convention on Persistent Organic Pollutants (POPs)
Convention to Combat Desertification (UNCCD)
implementation of Montreal Protocol on Substances That Deplete the Ozone Layer in some countries with "economies in transition" 
This mandate reflects the restructured GEF as of October 2011 .

World Trade Organization (WTO)

The WTO's mandate does not include a specific principle on the environment. All the problems linked to the environment are treated in such a way as to give priority to trade requirements and the principles of the WTO's own trade system. This produces conflictual situations. Even if the WTO recognizes the existence of MEAs, it denounces the fact that around 20 MEAs are in conflict with the WTO's trade regulations. Furthermore, certain MEAs can allow a country to ban or limit trade in certain products if they do not satisfy established environmental protection requirements. In these circumstances, if one country's ban relating to another country concerns two signatories of the same MEA, the principles of the treaty can be used to resolve the disagreement, whereas if the country affected by the trade ban with another country has not signed the agreement, the WTO demands that the dispute be resolved using the WTO's trade principles, in other words, without taking into account the environmental consequences.

Some criticisms of the WTO mechanisms may be too broad.  In a recently dispute over labelling of dolphin safe labels for tuna between the US and Mexico, the ruling was relatively narrow and did not, as some critics claimed,

International Monetary Fund (IMF)

The IMF's mission is "to ensure the stability of the international monetary system".

The IMF Green Fund proposal of Dominique Strauss-Kahn specifically to address "climate-related shocks in Africa", despite receiving serious attention was rejected. Strauss-Kahn's proposal, backed by France and Britain, was that "developed countries would make an initial capital injection into the fund using some of the $176 billion worth of SDR allocations from last year in exchange for a stake in the green fund."  However, "most of the 24 directors ... told Strauss-Kahn that climate was not part of the IMF's mandate and that SDR allocations are a reserve asset never intended for development issues."

UN ICLEI 

The UN's main body for coordinating municipal and urban decision-making is named the International Council for Local Environmental Initiatives. Its slogan is "Local Governments for Sustainability".
This body sponsored the concept of full cost accounting that makes environmental governance the foundation of other governance.

ICLEIs projects and achievements include:
Convincing thousands of municipal leaders to sign the World Mayors and Municipal Leaders Declaration on Climate Change (2005) which notably requests of other levels of government that:
Global trade regimes, credits and banking reserve rules be reformed to advance debt relief and incentives to implement policies and practices that reduce and mitigate climate change.
Starting national councils to implement this and other key agreements, e.g., ICLEI Local Governments for Sustainability USA
Spreading ecoBudget (2008) and Triple Bottom Line (2007) "tools for embedding sustainability into council operations", e.g. Guntur's Municipal Corporation, one of the first four to implement the entire framework.
Sustainability Planning Toolkit (launched 2009) integrating these and other tools
Cities Climate Registry (launched 2010) - part of UNEP Campaign on Cities and Climate Change

ICLEI promotes best practice exchange among municipal governments globally, especially green infrastructure, sustainable procurement.

Other secretariats
Other international institutions incorporate environmental governance in their action plans, including:

 United Nations Development Programme (UNDP), promoting development;
 World Meteorological Organization (WMO) which works on the climate and atmosphere;
 Food and Agriculture Organization  (FAO) working on the protection of agriculture, forests and fishing;
 International Atomic Energy Agency (IAEA) which focuses on nuclear security.

Over 30 UN agencies and programmes support environmental management, according to Najam. This produces a lack of coordination, insufficient exchange of information and dispersion of responsibilities. It also results in proliferation of initiatives and rivalry between them.

Criticism

According to Bauer, Busch and Siebenhüner, the different conventions and multilateral agreements of global environmental regulation is increasing their secretariats' influence. Influence varies according to bureaucratic and leadership efficiency, choice of technical or client-centered.

The United Nations is often the target of criticism, including from within over the multiplication of secretariats due to the chaos it produces. Using a separate secretariat for each MEA creates enormous overhead given the 45 international-scale and over 500 other agreements.

States

Environmental governance at the state level

Environmental protection has created opportunities for mutual and collective monitoring among neighbouring states. The European Union provides an example of the institutionalization of joint regional and state environmental governance. Key areas include information, led by the European Environment Agency (EEA), and the production and monitoring of norms by states or local institutions.
See also the Environmental policy of the European Union.

State participation in global environmental governance

US refusal to ratify major environment agreements produced tensions with ratifiers in Europe and Japan.

The World Bank, IMF and other institutions are dominated by the developed countries and do not always properly consider the requirements of developing countries.

Business

Environmental governance applies to business as well as government. Considerations are typical of those in other domains:

  values (vision, mission, principles);
  policy (strategy, objectives, targets);
  oversight (responsibility, direction, training, communication);
  process (management systems, initiatives, internal control, monitoring and review, stakeholder dialogue, transparency, environmental accounting, reporting and verification);
  performance (performance indicators, benchmarking, eco-efficiency, reputation, compliance, liabilities, business development).

White and Klernan among others discuss the correlation between environmental governance and financial performance. This correlation is higher in sectors where environmental impacts are greater.

Business environmental issues include emissions, biodiversity, historical liabilities, product and material waste/recycling, energy use/supply and many others.

Environmental governance has become linked to traditional corporate governance as an increasing number of shareholders are corporate environmental impacts. Corporate governance is the set of processes, customs, policies, laws, and institutions affecting the way a corporation (or company) is managed. Corporate governance is affected by the relationships among stakeholders. These stakeholders research and quantify performance to compare and contrast the environmental performance of thousands of companies.

Large corporations with global supply chains evaluate the environmental performance of business partners and suppliers for marketing and ethical reasons. Some consumers seek environmentally friendly and sustainable products and companies.

Non-governmental organizations

According to Bäckstrand and Saward, “broader participation by non-state actors in multilateral environmental decisions (in varied roles such as agenda setting, campaigning, lobbying, consultation, monitoring, and implementation) enhances the democratic legitimacy of environmental governance.”

Local activism is capable of gaining the support of the people and authorities to combat environmental degradatation. In Cotacachi, Ecuador, a social movement used a combination of education, direct action, the influence of local public authorities and denunciation of the mining company's plans in its own country, Canada, and the support of international environmental groups to influence mining activity.

Fisher cites cases in which multiple strategies were used to effect change. She describes civil society groups that pressure international institutions and also organize local events. Local groups can take responsibility for environmental governance in place of governments.

According to Bengoa, “social movements have contributed decisively to the creation of an institutional platform wherein the fight against poverty and exclusion has become an inescapable benchmark.” But despite successes in this area, “these institutional changes have not produced the processes for transformation that could have made substantial changes to the opportunities available to rural inhabitants, particularly the poorest and those excluded from society.” He cites several reasons:

 conflict between in-group cohesion and openness to outside influence;
 limited trust between individuals;
 contradiction between social participation and innovation;
 criticisms without credible alternatives to environmentally damaging activities

A successful initiative in Ecuador involved the establishment of stakeholder federations and management committees (NGOs, communities, municipalities and the ministry) for the management of a protected forest.

Proposals

The International Institute for Sustainable Development proposed an agenda for global governance. These objectives are:

 expert leadership;
 positioning science as the authoritative basis of sound environmental policy;
 coherence and reasonable coordination;
 well-managed institutions;
 incorporate environmental concerns and actions within other areas of international policy and action

Coherence and coordination 

Despite the increase in efforts, actors, agreements and treaties, the global environment continue to degrade at a rapid rate. From the big hole in Earth's ozone layer to over-fishing to the uncertainties of climate change, the world is confronted by several intrinsically global challenges. However, as the environmental agenda becomes more complicated and extensive, the current system has proven ineffective in addressing and tackling problems related to trans-boundary externalities and the environment is still experiencing degradation at unprecedented levels.

Inforesources identifies four major obstacles to global environmental governance, and describes measures in response. The four obstacles are:

 parallel structures and competition, without a coherent strategy
 contradictions and incompatibilities, without appropriate compromise
 competition between multiple agreements with incompatible objectives, regulations and processes
 integrating policy from macro- to micro- scales.

Recommended measures:

 MDGs (Millennium Development Goals) and conventions, combining sustainability and reduction of poverty and equity;
 country-level approach linking global and local scales
 coordination and division of tasks in a multilateral approach that supports developing countries and improves coordination between donor countries and institutions
 use of Poverty Reduction Strategy Papers (PRSPs) in development planning
 transform conflicts into tradeoffs, synergies and win-win options

Contemporary debates surrounding global environmental governance have converged on the idea of developing a stronger and more effective institutional framework. The views on how to achieve this, however, still hotly debated. Currently, rather than teaming up with the United Nations Environment Programme (UNEP), international environmental responsibilities have been spread across many different agencies including: a) specialised agencies within the UN system such as the World Meteorological Organisation, the International Maritime Organisation and others; b) the programs in the UN system such as the UN Development Program; c) the UN regional economic and social commission; d) the Bretton Woods institutions; e) the World Trade Organisation and; f) the environmentally focused mechanisms such as the Global Environment Facility and close to 500 international environmental agreements.

Some analysts also argue that multiple institutions and some degree of overlap and duplication in policies is necessary to ensure maximum output from the system. Others, however, claim that institutions have become too dispersed and lacking in coordination which can be damaging to their effectiveness in global environmental governance. Whilst there are various arguments for and against a WEO, the key challenge, however, remains the same: how to develop a rational and effective framework that will protect the global environment efficiently.

Democratization 

Starting in 2002, Saward and others began to view the Earth Summit process as capable opening up the possibility of stakeholder democracy. The summits were deliberative rather than simply participative, with NGOs, women, men, indigenous peoples and businesses joining the decision-making process alongside states and international organizations, characterized by:

 the importance given to scientific and technical considerations
 the official and unofficial participation of many actors with heterogeneous activity scopes
 growing uncertainty
 a new interpretation of international law and social organization models

As of 2013, the absence of joint rules for composing such fora leads to the development of non-transparent relations that favour the more powerful stakeholders. Criticisms assert that they act more as a lobbying platform, wherein specific interest groups attempt to influence governments.

Institutional reform

Actors inside and outside the United Nations are discussing possibilities for global environmental governance that provides a solution to current problems of fragility, coordination and coherence. Deliberation is focusing on the goal of making UNEP more efficient. A 2005 resolution recognizes “the need for more efficient environmental activities in the United Nations system, with enhanced coordination, improved policy advice and guidance, strengthened scientific knowledge, assessment and cooperation, better treaty compliance, while respecting the legal autonomy of the treaties, and better integration of environmental activities in the broader sustainable development framework.”

Proposals include:

 greater and better coordination between agencies;
 strengthen and acknowledge UNEP's scientific role;
 identify MEA areas to strengthen coordination, cooperation and teamwork between different agreements;
 increase regional presence;
 implement the Bali Strategic Plan on improving technology training and support for the application of environmental measures in poor countries;
 demand that UNEP and MEAs participate formally in all relevant WTO committees as observers.
 strengthen its financial situation;
 improve secretariats’ efficiency and effectiveness.

One of the main studies addressing this issue proposes:

 clearly divide tasks between development organizations, UNEP and the MEAs
 adopt a political direction for environmental protection and sustainable development
 authorize the UNEP Governing Council/Global Ministerial Environment Forum to adopt the UNEP medium-term strategy
 allow Member States to formulate and administer MEAs an independent secretariat for each convention
 support UNEP in periodically assessing MEAs and ensure coordination and coherence
 establish directives for setting up national/regional platforms capable of incorporating MEAs in the Common Country Assessment (CCA) process and United Nations Development Assistance Framework (UNDAF)
 establish a global joint planning framework
 study the aptitude and efficiency of environmental activities’ funding, focusing on differential costs
 examine and redefine the concept of funding differential costs as applicable to existing financial mechanisms
 reconsider remits, division of tasks and responsibilities between entities that provide services to the multipartite conferences. Clearly define the services that UN offices provide to MEA secretariats
 propose measures aiming to improve personnel provision and geographic distribution for MEA secretariats
 improve transparency resource use for supporting programmes and in providing services to MEAs. Draw up a joint budget for services supplied to MEAs.

Education

A 2001 Alliance 21 report proposes six fields of action:

 strengthen citizens' critical faculties to ensure greater democratic control of political orientations
 develop a global and critical approach
 develop civic education training for teachers
 develop training for certain socio-professional groups
 develop environmental education for the entire population;
 assess the resulting experiences of civil society

Transform daily life

Individuals can modify consumption, based on voluntary simplicity: changes in purchasing habits, simplified lifestyles (less work, less consumption, more socialization and constructive leisure time). But individual actions must not replace vigilance and pressure on policies. Notions of responsible consumption developed over decades, revealing the political nature of individual purchases, according to the principle that consumption should satisfy the population's basic needs. These needs comprise the physical wellbeing of individuals and society, a healthy diet, access to drinking water and plumbing, education, healthcare and physical safety. The general attitude centres on the need to reduce consumption and reuse and recycle materials. In the case of food consumption, local, organic and fair trade products which avoid ill treatment of animals has become a major trend.

Alternatives to the personal automobile are increasing, including public transport, car sharing and bicycles and alternative propulsion systems.

Alternative energy sources are becoming less costly.

Ecological industrial processes turn the waste from one industry into raw materials for another.

Governments can reduce subsidies/increase taxes/tighten regulation on unsustainable activities.

The Community Environmental governance Global Alliance encourages holistic approaches to environmental and economic challenges, incorporating indigenous knowledge. Okotoks, Alberta capped population growth based on the carrying capacity of the Sheep River. The Fraser Basin Council Watershed Governance in British Columbia, Canada, manages issues that span municipal jurisdictions. Smart Growth is an international movement that employs key tenets of Environmental governance in urban planning.

Policies and regulations

Establish policies and regulations that promote "infrastructures for well-being" whilst addressing the political, physical and cultural levels.

Eliminate subsidies that have a negative environmental impact and tax pollution

Promoting workers’ personal and family development.

Coordination

A programme of national workshops on synergies between the three Rio Conventions launched in late 2000, in collaboration with the relevant secretariats. The goal was to strengthen coordination at the local level by:

 sharing information
 promoting political dialogue to obtain financial support and implement programmes
 enabling the secretariats to update their joint work programmes.

According to Campbell, “In the context of globalization, the question of linking up environmental themes with other subjects, such as trade, investment and conflict resolution mechanisms, as well as the economic incentives to participate in and apply agreements would seem to provide an important lesson for the effective development of environmental governance structures.” Environmental concerns would become part of the global economic system. “These problems also contain the seeds of a new generation of international conflicts that could affect both the stability of international relations and collective security. Which is why the concept of ‘collective security’ has arisen.”

Moving local decisions to the global level is as important as the way in which local initiatives and best practices are part of a global system. Kanie points out that NGOs, scientists, international institutions and stakeholder partnerships can reduce the distance that separates the local and international levels.

See also

References

Sources

Forum for a New World Governance
 Lennart J. Lundqvist (2004), Sweden and Environmental governance: Straddling the Fence. Manchester University Press, 
 Srivastwa, Amit. (2017). "Environmental governance in the 21st century: a case study of China's environmental governance" (pdf), researchgate.net.

Environmentalism
Environmental policy
Environmental social science concepts
Sustainable development
 
Transboundary environmental issues